Bergen Håndball is a handball club located in Bergen. Their home matches are played in several arenas in Bergen, such as Haukelandshallen, Framohallen, Fana Arena, Åsane Arena and Sotra Arena. The home matches are organized in collaboration with the clubs that belong to the various halls, in this way it will develop the events and create belonging in all directions of the city. They compete in 1. divisjon.

Titles
REMA 1000-ligaen
 Gold: 2008/09

Team

Current squad
Squad for the 2022–23 season

Goalkeepers
 16  Tord Vårdal
 95  Jonas Fjæreide Fyllingen
Wingers
RW
 4  Tobias Holm
LW
 3  Iben Hvidsten
Line players
 6  Sondre Kvamme Skare
 47  Marcus Soltvedt

Back players
 7  Sigve Åkerøy Pettersen
 8  Christoffer Nesheim Hansen
 9  Rasmus Hedegaard Thaarup Carlsen
 11  Leif-Erik Brenne
 23  Miguel Jose Soares Neves
 25  Bjørn Christensen Mathiassen
 27  Kasper Berentsen Dalland

2021-2022 Transfers

Joining
  Vidar Gjesdal (Head coach)
  Rasmus Hedegaard Thaarup Carlsen (CB) (from  Kolstad Håndball)
  Jonas Fjæreide Fyllingen (GK) (from  Sotra)
  Kasper Berentsen Dalland (RB) (from  Sotra)
  Bjørn Christensen Mathiassen (CB/LB) (from  Viking TIF)
  Sigve Åkerøy Pettersen (CB) (from  Alta IF)
  Miguel Jose Soares Neves (LB) (from  Aguas Santas)
  Jon Obrestad Salte (LW) (from  Stavanger IF)

Leaving
  Fredrik Ruud (Head coach) (to  Nærbø IL)
  Sebastian Waage Mossestad (LB) (to  IF Hallby)
  Herman Bredal Oftedal (CB) (to  Kristiansand Topphåndball)
  Jens Dolberg Plougstrup (LB) (to  Bækkelaget Håndball Elite)
  Leander Myklebust Seime (LW) (to  Bækkelaget Håndball Elite)
  Ebbe Stankiewicz (RW) (to  Ystads IF)
  Birk Hermann Inselseth (RB) (to  ØIF Arendal)
  Fredrik Heskestad Clementsen (LP) (to  Lemvig-Thyborøn Håndbold)
  Philip Tandrup Holm (CB)

External links

Handball clubs established in 1946
1946 establishments in Norway
Norwegian handball clubs
Sport in Bergen